Direct Star was a French free-to-air music television channel owned by Vincent Bolloré, that launched on September 1st, 2010 and replaced Virgin 17. The channel was bought by Canal+ Group and replaced on 7 October 2012 by CStar.

History

Bolloré's development in TNT 
On June 10, 2010, Bolloré Group, whom already owned Direct 8, bought the Virgin 17 channel from Lagardère Active for a sum that would amount to approximately €70 million, excluding the takeover of staff (20 people) and part of the programs. On July 12, 2010, the CSA gave its agreement for this repurchase. Yannick Bolloré, future general manager of the channel, indicated it would be renamed Direct Star and announced its intention to keep the music-centric format of the channel and even to « strengthen the place of music in the first and second part of the evening » in a « more urban and contemporary » universe. Bolloré Group appointed Christophe Sabot (former manager at NRJ and Virgin 17) as director of the channel. On July 27, 2010, the group unveiled in a press release the new identity of Direct Star created by the Parisian agency Dream On, which is part of the graphic charter of the group's media activities. The Direct Star website went live on August 16, 2010.

On September 1, 2010, at midnight, Direct Star took over from Virgin 17 and broadcast its first music video, Lady Gaga's Alejandro. That same day, at 8PM, Direct Star officially replaced Virgin 17, with a giant alarm clock-shaped countdown as a launch program followed by a parody of an episode of the 30 Rock series.

After its thematic evening devoted to music with Star Story, on December 2nd, the channel launched Star Report, a new thematic evening devoted to the world of luxury.

On December 17, 2010, Direct Star was the first TNT channel to broadcast a live concert. This is -M- who ended his tour at Les Saisons de passage, at Paris-Bercy.

On December 26, 2010, Direct Star broadcast unpublished images of the last concerts and an exclusive interview with Jean-Michel Jarre. Numericable will broadcast an exclusive 3D program on "My 3D Channel".

On July 1, 2012, in an opinion piece the CSA published on the sale of the two chains of the Bolloré Group, the financial losses of these two chains appeared. Over the period of 2005-2010, Direct Star lost 61 million euros. Since the chain did not belong to Bolloré, but to Lagardère before mid-2010, the group was not responsible for these losses. In 2010, on a turnover of 23.7 million euros, the channel suffered an operating loss of 13.5 million euros and Direct Star's revenue growth was 56%.

Buyout by Canal+ 
On September 5, 2011, the Canal+ Group announced its intention to acquire 60% of Bolloré Média (with a 100% option within three years) which would make it the new owner of Direct Star. This transaction was to be validated by the French Competition Authority in order to be finalized. When the takeover was announced, Bertrand Meheut declared in an interview given in Les Échos that the programming of the two channels would evolve « gradually, in line with their current editorial policy and those of the Canal+ group channels ». The transaction was signed between the two groups in December 2011.

In January 2012, Canal+ appointed Ara Aprikian to head the new free channels division of the Canal+ Group. 
He is notably in charge of the transformation and integration of Direct Star into the style and editorial policy of Canal+. At this time, he proposed to the CSA a reduction, from 75% today to 50% in the long term, of the airtime reserved for musical programs on the channel, i.e. a reduction of one third of the airtime currently reserved for the music. 
In March 2012, Canal+ presented its proposals for film, sports, and advertising rights to the Autorité de la concurrence to obtain authorization for the buyout.

On July 23, 2012, the French Competition Authority accepted the buyout of Direct 8 and Direct Star, subject to conditions, by the Canal+ Group.
The CSA validated the operation on September 18, 2012 and the effective takeover from the Bolloré Group of its two former channels, Direct 8 and Direct Star, was finalized on September 27, 2012. On that date, the two channels were under the full operational control of Canal+ Group, who decided to change the name of Direct Star to "D17" on Sunday October 7, 2012 at 8:45 pm.

Programmes

Music
Star Music
Top Direct Star
Top Club
Top France
Top Hip-Hop
Top Rock
+ 2 Music
Star Story

Other
Morning Star
Zap Direct Star
Sport Extrême
Star Report
Star Player
Poker

Series
Degrassi
30 Rock
The Wire
24
The Dead Zone
The L Word'SkinsDead ZoneAliasYes, Dear ! (VF)ShamelessFlight of the ConchordsMa vie de starUnderbellyForces SpécialesAnimeOne PieceFullmetal AlchemistBlack ButlerFullmetal Alchemist: BrotherhoodDragon Ball ZBleachFairy TailReality TVAmerica's Next Top ModelRegime Tempo (VF)True Beauty (VF)Janice Dickinson Modeling AgencyParle à ma mère !Keeping Up with the Kardashians (VF)''

See also

 Direct 8
 Bolloré
 Télévision Numérique Terrestre

References

Defunct television channels in France
Television channels and stations established in 2010
Television channels and stations disestablished in 2012
French-language television stations
2010 establishments in France
2012 disestablishments in France